Roar is a fantasy adventure television series created by Shaun Cassidy and Ron Koslow. The series originally aired on the Fox network from July 14 until September 1, 1997. It is set in the year 400 AD, following a young Irish man, Conor (Heath Ledger), as he sets out to rid his land of the invading Romans, but in order to accomplish this, he must first unite the Celtic clans. The series also starred Vera Farmiga, Lisa Zane, John Saint Ryan, and Sebastian Roché. Roar was cancelled after 8 episodes due to low ratings, and the final 5 episodes were not broadcast by the network until 2000.

Plot
Roar chronicles the life of Conor (Ledger), a 20-year-old orphaned prince who must rise above tragedy to lead his people to freedom. Conor takes on a band of ragtag allies that include Tully (Greer), a teenage apprentice magician; Catlin (Farmiga), a beautiful former slave; and Fergus (Ryan), Conor's big-hearted, ebullient protector. Their primary struggle is against Longinus (Roché), a supernatural creature whose true essence is that of a 400-year-old Roman centurion ready to do the bidding of evil Queen Diana (Zane), who is an emissary of the Romans. In this fight for freedom, what is most important for Conor and his people is the Roar – the roar of the land, the roar of the people – a voice that echoes through every living creature and is the power of life.

Production

Development
The show was created by Shaun Cassidy on the heels of the success of the syndicated programs Hercules: The Legendary Journeys and Xena: Warrior Princess. However, Roar was not very well received in the United States and lasted for only one season (8 of the 13 episodes were aired in 1997, with the last 5 not broadcast until 2000).

Alignment with Christian tradition
One of the major villains in the program was Longinus, played by Sebastian Roché, an immortal cursed by God for interfering with his plans. By Christian tradition, Longinus was the centurion who stabbed Jesus Christ with his spear during the Crucifixion. This spear, the Spear of Destiny, was supposedly the only weapon that could release Longinus from his curse. The show freely mixed Christian mythology, Celtic mythology, Druidism, and smatterings of history.

Show notes
 While the original airing of the show in North America did not broadcast all of the episodes, when syndicated to Australia, Canada and the UK, all episodes were aired.
 Roar: The Complete Series was released on DVD on September 19, 2006. The 3-disc set includes all thirteen episodes.
 According to Sebastian Roché, the show was cancelled because it was up against Buffy the Vampire Slayer

Cast

Main

 Heath Ledger as Conor
 Lisa Zane as Queen Diana
 Sebastian Roché as Gaius Cassius Longinus
 Vera Farmiga as Catlin
 John Saint Ryan as Fergus
 Alonzo Greer as Tully

Recurring
 Michael Roughan as The Slavemaster
 Melissa George as Molly
 Carl Snell as Glas (The Father)
 Keri Russell as Claire
 Daniel Gecic as King Derek
 Peter McCauley as Culann / Brach

Episodes

Reception

Reviews
Ray Richmond, a television critic for Variety, gave the series a lukewarm review, "Even 1,500 years ago, it turns out that the Celtics were in need of a decent shooting guard and a big man in the middle. At least, that's what we're told in this adventure drama set in 5th century Europe that follows a ragtag band of Celtic warriors (is there another kind?) and their bloody battles with a group of nasty, oppressive Romans. Think of the Carringtons vs. the Colbys with a lot more leather... and fewer showers. Roar boasts deliciously elaborate costumes (from designer Jean Turnbull) and impeccable period detail. Yet unlike the divertingly cheesy Xena: Warrior Princess and Hercules: The Legendary Journeys, this summertime spectacle takes itself relatively seriously – a mistake when your chief female evildoer has a taste for bathing in cow dung." Hal Boedeker for the Orlando Sentinel gave a positive review, writing, "The young stars are attractive, the action rarely flags, and the show is a rare fresh offering on broadcast television this summer. It is also more rousing than many new hour series this fall."

Awards and nominations

Other media

Books
Two books were written based on the Roar universe. Published in 1998, by William T. Quick writing as "Sean Kiernan," Roar: A Novel gives a backstory leading up to the pilot episode, and Roar: The Cauldron tells the story of Conor's quest to find the legendary Cauldron.

References

External links
 

1997 American television series debuts
1997 American television series endings
Australian science fiction television series
English-language television shows
American fantasy television series
Fox Broadcasting Company original programming
Period television series
Television series by Universal Television
Television series created by Shaun Cassidy
Television series set in the Roman Empire
Television series set in the 5th century
Television shows set in Ireland
Australian fantasy television series
American adventure television series